A serial killer is typically a person who murders three or more people, with the murders taking place over more than a month and including a significant period of time between them. The Federal Bureau of Investigation (FBI) defines serial killing as "a series of two or more murders, committed as separate events, usually, but not always, by one offender acting alone".

Before 1917

Soviet era (1917–1991)

After 1991

Unidentified serial killers

See also
 Lists of serial killers

References

External links
 Serial killers on borntokillintheussr.com

Bibliography

 
 
 
 

serial russia

Russian criminals
Serial killers